Ganj Ali Khan (died 1624) was a military officer in Safavid Iran of Kurdish origin, who served as governor in various provinces and was known for his loyal service to king (shah) Abbas I. Ganj Ali Khan continuously aided the shah on almost all of his military campaigns until his own death in 1624/5. He was also a great builder, the Ganjali Khan Complex being one of his finest achievements.

Biography 

Ganj Ali Khan originally belonged to a Kurdish tribe roaming in western Iran, but was as a minor taken to Herat in Khorasan, where he grew up with prince Abbas I. They both became close friends, and continued to do so when Abbas I ascended the Safavid throne in 1587. In 1596, Abbas I, after having suppressed a rebellion in Kerman and put an end to Qizilbash governorship of the place, appointed Ganj Ali Khan as its governor. Furthermore, he was also appointed governor of Sistan, and shortly afterwards seized Qal'e-ye Fath and Qal'e-ye Taraqun from the Uzbeks. In 1602/3, he took part in the Safavid campaign to capture the Uzbek-controlled city of Bukhara. Furthermore, he also took part in the Ottoman–Safavid War of 1603–18. 

In the mid 1600s, the Zoroastrian community of Kerman protested against the hostile treatment by the local Islamic clergy, and also accused Ganj Ali Khan of seizing and destroying their homes to make space for his construction projects. This made Abbas travel to Kerman to investigate the matter in 1606, where he found that Ganj Ali Khan was not the real perpetrator. Abbas then returned to his capital, Isfahan, where he issued an edict that ordered protection for the Zoroastrians. 

In 1611, a rebellion in Balochistan occurred, which Ganj Ali Khan suppressed by capturing their stronghold. Five years later, Ganj Ali Khan was once again present in the Ottoman-Safavid War, and participated in the successful invasion of Georgia. In 1622, Ganj Ali Khan was appointed as the governor of the newly captured city of Qandahar. He later died in 1624/5, while the governorship of Qandahar went to his son Ali Mardan Khan and the governorship of Kerman to a certain Tahmasp Qoli Khan.

Building activities 
Ganj Ali Khan is mostly remembered for his building activities, such as the Zayn al-Din caravansary in Yazd, and the cistern in the Loot desert between Khorasan and Kerman.

His most prominent construction, is, however, the Ganjali Khan Complex in Kerman.

See also
List of Safavid governors of Kerman

References

Sources 

 
 
 
 
 
 
 
 

Safavid generals
1620s deaths
People from Herat
16th-century births
Iranian Kurdish people
Safavid governors of Kerman
People from Sistan
Safavid governors
Safavid governors of Qandahar
17th-century Iranian military personnel
16th-century Iranian military personnel
16th-century people of Safavid Iran
17th-century people of Safavid Iran